Jackie Goldsmith (March 21, 1921 – October 23, 1968) was an American basketball player. He was an All-American at the Brooklyn campus of Long Island University and played for one season in the American National Basketball League.

Goldsmith, a 5'8 guard, came to LIU following a high school career at nearby Thomas Jefferson High School. After a season on the school's freshman team, he spent three years in the United States Coast Guard during World War II, where he played basketball for various coast guard teams including the Diesels and the New London Bears at the Coast Guard Station New London, Connecticut, and the District Coast Guard in New York. After serving in the Coast Guard, he returned to LIU. Following the close of his college career, Goldsmith played briefly for the Toledo Jeeps of the NBL.

In 1951, Goldsmith became one of a number of New York City basketball figures implicated in the CCNY point shaving scandal.  He was ultimately sentenced to two and a half to four years in prison for fixing games at LIU and Manhattan College.

References

External links
NBL stats

1921 births
1968 deaths
All-American college men's basketball players
American men's basketball players
Guards (basketball)
LIU Brooklyn Blackbirds men's basketball players
Sportspeople from Brooklyn
Basketball players from New York City
Thomas Jefferson High School (Brooklyn) alumni
Toledo Jeeps players
United States Coast Guard personnel of World War II
American military sports players